Sol Dominicana Airlines (also known as Sol Airlines) was a Dominican airline that operated charter flights from the Dominican Republic. The airline's main hub was La Romana International Airport.

Destinations
Sol Dominicana Airlines flew to 12 destinations in 9 countries, including Aruba, Argentina, Brazil, Curaçao, Saint Martin, Canada, Mexico, Venezuela and the United States.

Fleet
The Sol Dominicana Airlines fleet consisted of the following aircraft (as of September 2008):

The first airline's first aircraft, a BAe-146, arrived at La Romana from Mexico on June 7, 2007.

See also
List of defunct airlines of the Dominican Republic

References

Defunct airlines of the Dominican Republic
Airlines established in 2007
Airlines disestablished in 2009
Defunct companies of the Dominican Republic